The Mauritius–Rodrigues Submarine Cable (MARS) is the first optical fiber submarine communications cable linking Mauritius to Rodrigues.

It was commissioned in November 2017 by the Government of Mauritius. The project was awarded to Mauritius Telecom and executed by PCCW Global with Huawei Marine as the installer. The MARS submarine cable has a design capacity of 8 Terabits per second and an initial lit capacity of 100 Gigabits per second.

The MARS cable is deployed with a no-burial laying methodology. It consists of two fibre pairs and six submarine repeaters using the dense wavelength division multiplexing transmission technology.

The laying of the submarine cable started on the 6 November 2018 at La Prairie, Mauritius and was connected to Rodrigues on the 17 November 2018. The cable is expected to be ready for service in March 2019.

Upon activation, the MARS cable would produce a 500-fold increase in bandwidth to Rodrigues, which has until now only been connected to the outside world through satellites.

The MARS cable has landing points at:
 , Mauritius
 Grand Baie, Rodrigues

References

External links
 Mauritius And Rodrigues Submarine (MARS) Cable Project Cable Landing in Rodrigues
 MARS on Submarine Cable Map

Submarine communications cables in the Indian Ocean
2019 establishments in Mauritius